Álvaro López (born May 21, 1951, in Zacatecas, Zacatecas, Mexico) is a Mexican former boxer and current member of the Boxing Hall of Fame. A native of Zacatecas, Zacatecas, López was very popular among Mexicans and is considered by many as one of the greatest Light Heavyweights to never become world champion.

Early life
The story of López starts with his birth under a bull ring in the Plaza de Toros San Pedro in Zacatecas, Zacatecas, Mexico. He was raised for 14 years underneath the seats in an adobe garage of a famous Bullring in Zacatecas.

A Young López had dreams of becoming a Matador. However, when López was in his teens, in his very first bull fight, after about four or five passes, the bull drove his horn into his ankle which shattered it. Due to his shattered ankle, he gave up his dreams of becoming a bullfighter.

Amateur career
López ended his amateur career with a record of 13–3. At the Diamond Belt Championship in Eureka, California, he knocked out the defending champion to win the title. A lot of Native Americans were at the event and asked his trainer Jack Cruz, if Álvaro was Native American. Cruz lied and told them that López was of Yaqui heritage.

Professional career
In April 1972, Álvaro faced the veteran Herman Hampton to win his pro debut. The bout was held at the Civic Auditorium in Stockton, California.

WBC Light Heavyweight Championship
On October 9, 1976, López lost a very disputed decision to world champion John Conteh. Many people in the crowd thought López had pulled off the upset. The fight was held in Denmark.

WBA Light Heavyweight Championship
Álvaro met Víctor Galíndez in two installment for the WBA Light Heavyweight Championship.  The fights were held in Italy.  Some boxing writers thought that Álvaro won the fights, though the decision victories went to the champion, Galindez.

He was one of the very few boxers of his time to challenge James Scott at the Rahway State Prison.

1980 Fight of the Year
López would later fight in the Ring Magazine's 1980 Fight of the Year against WBC Light Heavyweight Champion, Matthew Saad Muhammad. The first half of the fight was dominated by López, with all three score cards very close up until the fourteenth round. When Álvaro ran out of energy to continue fighting and was stopped.

WBC Cruiserweight Championship
In Álvaro's last world title attempt, he would lose to the much younger WBC Cruiserweight Champion, Carlos De León. López would then wait almost a year and fight Bash Ali, before retiring from boxing.

Legacy
Lopez is a member of both California Boxing Hall of Fame and the World Boxing Hall of Fame. He has his own gym named after him, Yaqui Lopez's Fat City Boxing.www.yaquilopezsfatcityboxing.com During Álvaro's career he faced Víctor Galíndez, Mike Rossman, Mike Quarry, Tony Mundine, Jesse Burnett, James Scott, S. T. Gordon, Matthew Saad Muhammad, Carlos De León, Michael Spinks, and John Conteh.

Professional boxing record

|-
|align="center" colspan=8|61 Wins (39 knockouts, 22 decisions), 15 Losses (6 knockouts, 9 decisions) 
|-
| align="center" style="border-style: none none solid solid; background: #e3e3e3"|Res.
| align="center" style="border-style: none none solid solid; background: #e3e3e3"|Record
| align="center" style="border-style: none none solid solid; background: #e3e3e3"|Opponent
| align="center" style="border-style: none none solid solid; background: #e3e3e3"|Type
| align="center" style="border-style: none none solid solid; background: #e3e3e3"|Round
| align="center" style="border-style: none none solid solid; background: #e3e3e3"|Date
| align="center" style="border-style: none none solid solid; background: #e3e3e3"|Location
| align="center" style="border-style: none none solid solid; background: #e3e3e3"|Notes
|-
|Loss
|61-15
|align=left| Bash Ali
|
|
|
|align=left| 
|
|-
|Loss
|61-14
|align=left| Carlos De Leon
|
|
|
|align=left| 
|align=left|
|-
|Win
|61-13
|align=left| Eddie Gonzales
|
|
|
|align=left| 
|
|-
|Win
|60-13
|align=left| Mike Jameson
|
|
|
|align=left| 
|
|-
|Win
|59-13
|align=left| James Williams
|
|
|
|align=left| 
|
|-
|Win
|58-13
|align=left| Roger Braxton
|
|
|
|align=left| 
|
|-
|Win
|57-13
|align=left| Ken Arlt
|
|
|
|align=left| 
|
|-
|Win
|56-13
|align=left| David Smith
|
|
|
|align=left| 
|align=left|
|-
|Win
|55-13
|align=left| Alvin Dominey
|
|
|
|align=left| 
|
|-
|Loss
|54-13
|align=left| Johnny Davis
|
|
|
|align=left| 
|
|-
|Win
|54-12
|align=left| Tony Mundine
|
|
|
|align=left| 
|
|-
|Loss
|53-12
|align=left| ST Gordon
|
|
|
|align=left| 
|align=left|
|-
|Win
|53-11
|align=left| Willie Taylor
|
|
|
|align=left| 
|
|-
|Win
|52-11
|align=left| George O'Mara
|
|
|
|align=left| 
|
|-
|Win
|51-11
|align=left| Grover Robinson
|
|
|
|align=left| 
|
|-
|Win
|50-11
|align=left| Carl Ivy
|
|
|
|align=left| 
|
|-
|Loss
|49-11
|align=left| Michael Spinks
|
|
|
|align=left| 
|
|-
|Loss
|49-10
|align=left| Matthew Muhammad
|
|
|
|align=left| 
|align=left|
|-
|Win
|49-9
|align=left| Bobby Lloyd
|
|
|
|align=left| 
|
|-
|Win
|48-9
|align=left| Pete McIntyre
|
|
|
|align=left| 
|
|-
|Loss
|47-9
|align=left| James Scott
|
|
|
|align=left| 
|
|-
|Win
|47-8
|align=left| Bash Ali
|
|
|
|align=left| 
|
|-
|Win
|46-8
|align=left| Andros Ernie Barr
|
|
|
|align=left| 
|
|-
|Win
|45-8
|align=left| Ivy Brown
|
|
|
|align=left| 
|
|-
|Win
|44-8
|align=left| Wilbert Albers
|
|
|
|align=left| 
|
|-
|Loss
|43-8
|align=left| Matthew Muhammad
|
|
|
|align=left| 
|align=left|
|-
|Win
|43-7
|align=left| Jesse Burnett
|
|
|
|align=left| 
|
|-
|Loss
|42-7
|align=left| Victor Galindez
|
|
|
|align=left| 
|align=left|
|-
|Win
|42-6
|align=left| Mike Rossman
|
|
|
|align=left| 
|
|-
|Win
|41-6
|align=left| Fabian Falconette
|
|
|
|align=left| 
|
|-
|Win
|40-6
|align=left| Clarence Geigger
|
|
|
|align=left| 
|
|-
|Win
|39-6
|align=left| Chuck Warfield
|
|
|
|align=left| 
|
|-
|Loss
|38-6
|align=left| Victor Galindez
|
|
|
|align=left| 
|align=left|
|-
|Win
|38-5
|align=left| Benny Barra
|
|
|
|align=left| 
|
|-
|Win
|37-5
|align=left| Manuel Fierro
|
|
|
|align=left| 
|
|-
|Win
|36-5
|align=left| Bobby Lloyd
|
|
|
|align=left| 
|
|-
|Loss
|35-5
|align=left| Lonnie Bennett
|
|
|
|align=left| 
|
|-
|Win
|35-4
|align=left| Larry Castaneda
|
|
|
|align=left| 
|
|-
|Win
|34-4
|align=left| Danny Brewer
|
|
|
|align=left| 
|
|-
|Win
|33-4
|align=left| Pete McIntyre
|
|
|
|align=left| 
|
|-
|Win
|32-4
|align=left| Clarence Geigger
|
|
|
|align=left| 
|
|-
|Loss
|31-4
|align=left| John Conteh
|
|
|
|align=left| 
|align=left|
|-
|Win
|31-3
|align=left| Larry Castaneda
|
|
|
|align=left| 
|
|-
|Win
|30-3
|align=left| Karl Zurheide
|
|
|
|align=left| 
|
|-
|Win
|29-3
|align=left| David Smith
|
|
|
|align=left| 
|
|-
|Win
|28-3
|align=left| Terry Lee
|
|
|
|align=left| 
|
|-
|Win
|27-3
|align=left| Jesse Burnett
|
|
|
|align=left| 
|align=left|
|-
|Loss
|26-3
|align=left| Jesse Burnett
|
|
|
|align=left| 
|align=left|
|-
|Win
|26-2
|align=left| Gary Summerhays
|
|
|
|align=left| 
|
|-
|Win
|25-2
|align=left| Mike Quarry
|
|
|
|align=left| 
|
|-
|Win
|24-2
|align=left| Lee Mitchell
|
|
|
|align=left| 
|
|-
|Win
|23-2
|align=left| Terry Lee
|
|
|
|align=left| 
|align=left|
|-
|Win
|22-2
|align=left| Hildo Silva
|
|
|
|align=left| 
|
|-
|Win
|21-2
|align=left| Bobby Rascon
|
|
|
|align=left| 
|
|-
|Win
|20-2
|align=left| Joe Cokes
|
|
|
|align=left| 
|
|-
|Win
|19-2
|align=left| Hildo Silva
|
|
|
|align=left| 
|align=left|
|-
|Win
|18-2
|align=left| Willie Warren
|
|
|
|align=left| 
|
|-
|Win
|17-2
|align=left| Andy Kendall
|
|
|
|align=left| 
|
|-
|Win
|16-2
|align=left| Al Bolden
|
|
|
|align=left| 
|
|-
|Win
|15-2
|align=left| Alfonso Gonzalez
|
|
|
|align=left| 
|
|-
|Win
|14-2
|align=left| Charlie Brooks
|
|
|
|align=left| 
|
|-
|Win
|13-2
|align=left| Herman Hampton
|
|
|
|align=left| 
|
|-
|Win
|12-2
|align=left| Ron Wilson
|
|
|
|align=left| 
|
|-
|Win
|11-2
|align=left| Dave Rogers
|
|
|
|align=left| 
|
|-
|Win
|10-2
|align=left| Ron Wilson
|
|
|
|align=left| 
|
|-
|Win
|9-2
|align=left| Hildo Silva
|
|
|
|align=left| 
|
|-
|Loss
|8-2
|align=left| Al Bolden
|
|
|
|align=left| 
|
|-
|Win
|8-1
|align=left| Polo Ramirez
|
|
|
|align=left| 
|
|-
|Win
|7-1
|align=left| Van Sahib
|
|
|
|align=left| 
|
|-
|Win
|6-1
|align=left| Herman Hampton
|
|
|
|align=left| 
|
|-
|Win
|5-1
|align=left| Mark Hearn
|
|)
|
|align=left| 
|
|-
|Win
|4-1
|align=left| Henry Tavake
|
|
|
|align=left| 
|
|-
|Loss
|3-1
|align=left| Jesse Burnett
|
|
|
|align=left| 
|
|-
|Win
|3-0
|align=left| Cisco Solorio
|
|
|
|align=left| 
|
|-
|Win
|2-0
|align=left| Herman Hampton
|
|
|
|align=left| 
|
|-
|Win
|1-0
|align=left| Herman Hampton
|
|
|
|align=left| 
|
|}

References

External links

 Homepage of Fat City Boxing Club

1951 births
Living people
Boxers from Zacatecas
People from Zacatecas City
Light-heavyweight boxers
Cruiserweight boxers
Mexican male boxers